Lush may refer to:

People

Music
 Lush (band), a British rock band
 Lush (Mitski album), a 2012 album by Mitski
 Lush (Snail Mail album), a 2018 album by Snail Mail
 "Lush", a single by Skepta featuring Jay Sean
 Lush 3, a single by Orbital

Other
 Lush., the standard author abbreviation used to indicate Alfred Wyndham Lushington as the author when citing a botanical name
 Lush (novel), a 2006 novel by Natasha Friend
 Lush (film), a 1999 film starring Campbell Scott
 Lush (company), a cosmetics company
 Lush Radio, the student radio station of the University of Leicester
 A person who drinks alcohol to excess habitually, see Drunkenness or Alcoholism
 Lush 99.5FM, a Singaporean radio station

See also 
 Lush Life (disambiguation)
 Lusher (disambiguation)
 Lushi (disambiguation)